Hewa Kaluhalamullage Suraj Randiv Kaluhalamulla (born 30 January 1985), formerly Mohamed Marshuk Mohamed Suraj, known popularly as Suraj Randiv, is a former professional Sri Lankan cricketer, who played all formats of the game. He plays first-class cricket for Sinhalese Sports Club. Suraj was educated at Rahula College Matara. He is now working as a bus driver.

Early career
A right arm offspinner, Suraj had a successful under-age career in Sri Lanka. He represented his country at under-15 and under-19 level and took 23 wickets in four matches at an Under-23 tournament of 2003–04. This effort caught the attention of Marvan Atapattu, who was influential in getting him over to Sinhalese Sports Club. He went on play for Sri Lanka A and Sri Lanka.

Suraj Randiv converted from Islam to Buddhism.

International career
In December 2009, he replaced Muttiah Muralitharan in Sri Lanka's ODI squad in India and he made his debut in the second match of the series in Nagpur. He impressed by taking three wickets for 51 runs; Sri Lanka went on to win the match by three wickets.

On 16 August 2010, in an incident that drew considerable media attention, Randiv intentionally bowled a no-ball—overstepping the bowling mark by a significant margin—to Virender Sehwag—then on 99—that ensured a victory for India in the ODI which was part of tri-series, while denying Sehwag a chance to score a century. Sehwag hit the ball for six but as the winning run was registered as soon as the umpire signalled no-ball, Sehwag's shot was deemed to have been made after the end of the match. Randiv later apologised to Sehwag for use of the tactic; he was docked his match fees for the game and handed a one match suspension by Sri Lanka Cricket. It was revealed that fellow mate Tillekaratne Dilshan advised and urged Randiv to bowl no-ball at Sehwag.

He was omitted from Sri Lanka's squad for the 2011 Cricket World Cup, but was called up as a replacement for the injured Angelo Mathews, and was subsequently picked for the World Cup Final.

After 5 years of long period, Randiv was selected for England tour in 2016, where he played in the second ODI on 24 June 2016.

Domestic career
Randiv was picked up by the Chennai Super Kings at the 2011 IPL player auction and played for the Chennai Super Kings for two seasons. He was released in 2012 before the start of IPL 5. In 2016, he played for Coleraine Cricket Club in Northern Ireland as their designated professional cricketer.

After migrating to Australia, he went onto play at district level competitions in Australia. He plays for Dandenong Cricket Club which is affiliated with Victoria Premier Cricket. In December 2020, he was invited by the Cricket Australia for a temporary role as a net bowler to bowl at the Australian cricketers in the nets ahead of their home test series against India (Border-Gavaskar Trophy).

Post cricket 
Randiv pursued his later career as a bus driver, working for France-based international public transport agency Transdev in Melbourne, Australia.

References

External links
 
 Premier League Cricket - Suraj Randiv takes eight (The Island)

1985 births
Living people
Chennai Super Kings cricketers
Alumni of Rahula College
Sinhalese Sports Club cricketers
Sri Lankan cricketers
Sri Lanka Test cricketers
Sri Lanka One Day International cricketers
Sri Lanka Twenty20 International cricketers
Ruhuna cricketers
Kandurata cricketers
Sri Lanka Schools XI cricketers
Bloomfield Cricket and Athletic Club cricketers
Nagenahira Nagas cricketers
Nondescripts Cricket Club cricketers
Wayamba cricketers
Galle Guardians cricketers
Khelaghar Samaj Kallyan Samity cricketers
Converts to Buddhism from Islam
Sri Lankan former Muslims